The Central India Agency was created in 1854, by amalgamating the Western Malwa Agency with other smaller political offices which formerly reported to the Governor-General of India. The agency was overseen by a political agent who maintained British relations with the princely states and influence over them on behalf of the Governor-General. The headquarters of the agent were at Indore.

List of Divisions and Princely States/districts of Agency

Bundelkhand Agency 

Bundelkhand Agency was bounded by Bagelkhand to the east, the United Provinces to the north, Lalitpur District to the west, and the Central Provinces to the south. Bagelkhand Agency was separated from Bundelkhand in 1871. In 1900 it included 9 states, the most important of which were Orchha, Panna, Samthar, Charkhari, Chhatarpur, Datia, Bijawar and Ajaigarh. The agency also included 13 estates and the pargana of Alampur, the latter belonging to Indore State.

In 1931, all of the states under the Baghelkhand Agency apart from Rewa and Singrauli were transferred back to Bundelkhand.

Salute states, by precedence: 
 Datia, title Maharaja, Hereditary salute of 15-guns
 Orchha, title Maharaja or Raja (from 1882, Saramad-i-Rajha-i-Bundelkhand Maharaja), Hereditary salute of 15-guns
 Ajaigarh, title Maharaja, Hereditary salute of 11-guns
 Baoni, title Nawab, Hereditary salute of 11-guns
 Bijawar, title Maharaja, Hereditary salute of 11-guns
 Charkhari, title Maharaja, Hereditary salute of 11-guns
 Panna, title Maharaja, Hereditary salute of 11-guns
 Samthar, title Raja, Hereditary salute of 11-guns

Non-salute states, alphabetically:
 Alipura, title Rao  
 Beri (Beri-Bundelkhand), title Rao/Raja (originally Dewan)
 Bihat
 Chhatarpur, title Maharaja or Raja 
 Garrauli
 Gaurihar, title Sardar Sawai; from 1859, Rao
 Jigni, title Rao
 Lugasi
 Naigawan Rebai
 Sarila, title Raja

Jagirs :
 Banka-Pahari
 Bijna
 Bilheri jagir, ?under Chhatarpur, guaranteed by the British
 Dhurwai
 Tori Fatehpur (one of the Hasht-Bhaiya jagirs)

Former princely States that were annexed or seized by the British :
 Banpur, seized in 1857, had been claimed by Gwalior State
 Bijeraghogarh, seized
 Chirgaon (one of the Hasht Bhaiya jagirs), seized
 Jalaun, annexed in 1840
 Jaitpur, annexed in 1849
 Jhansi, annexed in 1853
 Khaddi, annexed 
 Purwa (one of the Chaube Jagirs), seized
 Tiroha, seized 
 Shahgarh, seized in 1857

Bagelkhand Agency 

Bagelkhand Agency, the easternmost charge, was established in March 1871, when it was separated from Bundelkhand agency. In 1900, it covered the area of twelve states, including :

Salute states, by precedence :
 Rewa, the largest state in Bagelkhand, title Maharaja, Hereditary salute of 15-guns
 Baraundha, title Raja, Hereditary salute of 9-guns
 Maihar, title Raja, Hereditary salute of 9-guns

Non-salute states (alphabetically) :
 Bhaisaunda
 Jaso
 Kamta-Rajaula
 Kothi
 Nagode
 Pahra
 Paldeo
 Sohawal
 Taraon

Zamindari Estates (alphabetically) :

 Sohagpur
 Shahpur
 Jaitpur
 Singrauli, also Nifs Singrauli (a mu'amaladari of 700 villages in Rewah) to distinguish it from a smaller zamindari in Singrauli Mirzapur District, North-Western Provinces in what is now eastern UP.)
 Amarkantak
 Nigwani
 Anupur
 Baikunthpur
 Chandiya
 Dhangawan
 Singbana
In 1931, all of the states but Rewa were transferred back to Bundelkhand, and in 1933 Rewa was transferred to the Indore Residency.

Gwalior Residency 
Gwalior Residency was placed under the Central India Agency in 1854, and separated from Central India Agency in 1921. It included the following, among other smaller states, plus Chhabra pargana (district) of Tonk State : Include Jagirs Chhadawad, Bagli, Dattigaon, Balipur/chikli, Nimkheda, Pathari, Tonk Khurd, etc.

Salute states :
 Gwalior, title Maharaja Scindia; Hereditary salute of 21-guns. 
 Rampur, title Nawab; Hereditary salute of 15-guns
 Benares (Ramnagar), title Maharaja; Hereditary salute of 13-guns (15-guns local)

Non-salute states :
 Bhadaura
 Garha
 Khaniadhana
 Raghogarh
 Paron
 Umri

Furthermore, lesser estates (under Thakurs or diwans) 
 Agra Barkhera
 Kathaun
 Khiaoda
 Sangul Wardha
 Sirsi

Bhopal Agency 
Bhopal Agency, which included the following :

Salute states, by precedence :
 Bhopal, title Nawab, Hereditary salute of 19-guns (21-guns local)
 Dewas Junior and Dewas Senior, title Maharaja, Hereditary salutes of 15-guns (transferred to Malwa Agency in 1907, and to Bhopal Agency in 1933)
 Narsinghgarh, title Raja, Hereditary salute of 11-guns
 Rajgarh, title Raja, Hereditary salute of 11-guns
 Khilchipur, title Raja, Hereditary salute of 9-guns

Non-salute states, alphabetically :
 Basoda
 Kurwai (Korwai)
 Makrai (transferred to Bhopal Agency in 1933 from the Central Provinces and Berar)
 Maksudangarh
 Muhammadgarh
 Pathari

Indore Residency 
Indore Residency included most of Indore (Holkar) and after 1933 also  Rewa State, the largest state from the Baghelkhand Agency.

Malwa Agency 
Malwa Agency, which included parts of Gwalior, Indore and Tonk states and the states of:

Salute states, by precedence :
 Ratlam State, title Maharaja Bahadur, Hereditary salute of 13-guns (15-guns local)
 Jaora State, title Nawab, Hereditary salute of 13-guns
 Sailana State, title Raja Bahadur, Hereditary salute of 11-guns
 Jhabua State, title Raja, Hereditary salute of 11-guns
 Sitamau State, title Raja, Hereditary salute of 11-guns

Non-salute states :
 Piploda State

Estates :
 Panth-Piploda .

In 1925, the Malwa Agency was amalgamated with Bhopawar Agency.

Bhopawar Agency 
Bhopawar Agency included the princely states of Malwa region:
It also included territories of Gwalior and Indore States. In 1927 the agency was renamed the Southern States Agency, later the Southern States and Malwa Agency, and after 1934 Malwa Agency.

Salute states, by precedence :
 Dhar, title Maharaja, Hereditary salute of 15-guns
The following were the jagirs (estates), ruled by the Bhilala tribes, that were under the Suzerainty of Dhar State.:

 Kali-Baori
Nimkhera (alias Tirla) 
 Rajgadh

 Barwani, title Maharana, Hereditary salute of 11-guns
 Jhabua, title Raja, Hereditary salute of 11-guns

Estates :
 Jobat
 Kathiwara
 Mathwar
 Ratanmal 
 Bakhatgarh
 Dotria
 Kachhi-Baroda
 Multhan
Discontinued :
 Amjhera, title Rao
 Chhadawad, title Rao

Jagirs (incomplete) :
 Jamnia, title Raja
 Kali-Baori
 Nimkhera 
 Ondhwa
 Rajgadh 
 Sondhwa

Post-independence 

Upon the British withdrawal from India in 1947, the rulers of the princely states in this area all chose to accede to the new Union of India. The eastern portion of Central India Agency, including Bagelkhand and Bundelkhand agencies, became the new state Vindhya Pradesh. The western portion, including Bhopal, Malwa, and Bhopawar agencies and the Gwalior and Indore residencies, became the new state of Madhya Bharat. Bhopal became a separate state. Makrai was transferred to Madhya Pradesh, which had been created from the former Central Provinces and Berar in 1950. In 1956, the states of Vindhya Pradesh, Madhya Bharat, and Bhopal were merged into Madhya Pradesh. Later another state, Chhattisgarh, was formed from the area that was formerly Madhya Pradesh.

See also 
 List of princely states of British India (alphabetical)
 List of Maratha dynasties and states
 List of Rajput dynasties and states
 Maratha Empire
 Rajputana

References

External links 
 Hunter, William Wilson, Sir, et al. (1908). Imperial Gazetteer of India, Volume 12. 1908–1931; Clarendon Press, Oxford.

Agencies of British India
Historical Indian regions
1854 establishments in India
1854 establishments in British India
1947 disestablishments in India
1947 disestablishments in British India
History of Madhya Pradesh